Serayah Ranee McNeill (born June 20, 1995) also known mononymously as Serayah, is an American actress, model and singer, best known for her role as singer Tiana Brown on the television show Empire.

Early life
Serayah Ranee McNeill was born in Encinitas, California. She graduated from Taft High School in Woodland Hills, California, where she played for the girls' varsity basketball team, in 2013.

Acting career
The character of Tiana on Empire marks her first major acting role. In a 2015 interview with Black Enterprise, Serayah stated of her role, "One thing I always say about this show is it's a lot of drama, but it's family drama so people relate. Every family has some type of drama, and I think that it touches on a lot of the entertainment business and the music business. Some exaggerated parts, but it really does touch on some of the things that happen." She was added to the series regular cast on August 26, 2015.

In March 2021, Serayah joined the cast of Black Mafia Family in a recurring role.

Musical career
In 2015, Serayah appeared in singer Taylor Swift's video for the song "Bad Blood" as the character Dilemma. On July 18, 2015, Swift performed a rendition of her song "Style" alongside McNeill on the Chicago stop of her The 1989 World Tour.
She performed at Marshall Academy of the Arts in Long Beach in March 2015. In 2016, she was featured in the RedOne song "Don't You Need Somebody", that also features Enrique Iglesias, R. City and Shaggy. In 2018, she released her debut EP Addicted. In 2019, she played a main role in the music video for "Undecided" by Chris Brown. Appeared in 2022 music video by Diddy feat. Bryson Tiller - Gotta Move On.

Filmography

Film

Television

Discography
EPs
 Addicted (2018)
 ''Ray ' ' (2020)

Featured

Notes

References

External links 

 
 
 

Living people
African-American actresses
William Howard Taft Charter High School alumni
21st-century African-American women singers
1995 births
21st-century American singers
21st-century American women singers